born March 3, 1954, is a Japanese politician, a member of the House of Representatives in the Diet national legislature.

Overview 

A native of Kashiwa, Chiba and graduate of Senshu University, he was elected for the first time in 2003 as a member of the Democratic Party of Japan after an unsuccessful run in 2000. He was one of nine lawmakers to resign from the party in December 2011 over an intended consumption tax hike.

Uchiyama and his follow DPJ dissidents launched the Kizuna Party on January 4, 2012. He is the party President.

References

External links 
  in Japanese.
 Kizuna Party Home Page (Japanese)

Members of the House of Representatives (Japan)
Politicians from Chiba Prefecture
Living people
1954 births
People from Kashiwa
Democratic Party of Japan politicians
21st-century Japanese politicians